Sattleria izoardi is a moth in the family Gelechiidae. It was described by Peter Huemer and Klaus Siegfried Oskar Sattler in 1992. It is found in the Hautes-Alpes of France and in Italy.

Adults are on wing from late July to late August.

References

Sattleria
Moths described in 1992